Robert Porter was a neurosurgeon in California. Porter was a founding member of the Brain Research Institute. He became Professor of Neurological Surgery at the University of California, Irvine, College of Medicine in 1969, and was Professor Emeritus there.

Education 
Porter studied at Northwestern University, taking a B.S. in 1946, a M.S. in 1948, and a M.D. in 1950. He did an internship at the Los Angeles County General Hospital. Next he had a fellowship in neuroscience at the University of California, Los Angeles. In 1952, he earned a Ph.D. from Northwestern University. That was followed by residency training in neurological surgery at the Veterans Administration Hospital in Long Beach.

Career 
For two years Porter was in the U.S. Army, performing neurosurgical investigations at the Walter Reed Army Institute of Research. 
In 1958 he became Chief of the Neurosurgical Service and Director of Research at the VA Hospital. He joined the faculty of the UCLA School of Medicine, having appointments in both anatomy and neurological surgery. In 1963 he was a lecturer and visiting neurosurgeon in the Department of Surgical Neurology at the University of Edinburgh, developing clinical and research techniques in stereotactic neurosurgery.

Porter's research has concerned the integration of central autonomic function and the interrelationships between the brain stem and abnormal visceral function. His clinical neurosurgical interests have been in spinal cord injury and functional stereotaxy.

Porter has 120 publications in his bibliography. Porter died June 9, 2021, in Marin, California.

Accomplishments and awards  
Porter is a member of the American Medical Association, American College of Surgeons, American Association of Neurological Surgeons, American Academy of Neurological Surgery, Research Society of Neurological Surgeons, Western Neurosurgical Society (President, 1971), California Association of Neurological Surgeons, Southern California Neurosurgical Society (President, 1967), American Physiological Society and the American Association of Anatomists.

Publications

References 

1926 births
2021 deaths
David Geffen School of Medicine at UCLA faculty
University of California, Irvine faculty
American neurosurgeons
American neuroscientists
Northwestern University alumni
University of California, Los Angeles alumni
People from San Diego